The 2006–07 NCAA Division I men's basketball season began on November 7, 2006, progressed through the regular season and conference tournaments, and concluded with the 2007 NCAA Division I men's basketball tournament championship game on April 2, 2007 at the Georgia Dome in Atlanta, Georgia. The Florida Gators successfully defended their national championship with an 84–75 victory over the Ohio State Buckeyes.

Season headlines 

 The Florida Gators successfully defended their National Championship, becoming the first team in 15 years to win consecutive titles. The Gators also became the first team to win both the NCAA football and basketball championships during the same academic year.
 The Gators' Lee Humphrey broke Bobby Hurley's NCAA tournament record for three-pointers. Humphrey hit 55 threes in 14 games over his career.
 It was the year of the freshman as Texas' Kevin Durant became the first freshman ever to be named National player of the year. Meanwhile, Ohio State's Greg Oden was an AP first-team All-American, as well as National defensive player of the year.
 Texas Tech coach Bob Knight won his 880th game in a 70–68 win over New Mexico on January 1, 2006. The win moved Knight ahead of Dean Smith for the most career coaching wins in Division I history.
 Florida coach Billy Donovan made headlines as he accepted the Orlando Magic head coaching job, only to return to the Gators.
 Five Duquesne players were shot and injured at an altercation following a campus dance party on September 17, 2006. Coach Ron Everhart drew praise from the media and coaching community as he brought the team together after the tragedy.
 Two players broke the NCAA Division I career free throw percentage record that had been held by Villanova's Gary Buchanan since 2004 (91.3%). Blake Ahearn of Missouri State became the new record-holder, finishing his career with a 94.6%. Derek Raivio of Gonzaga finished second in Division I history at 92.7%.
 Alabama A&M's Mickell Gladness broke the NCAA single-game blocked shot record, swatting 16 shots in a February 24 game against Texas Southern. The previous record had been 14, held by four players.
 The preseason AP All-American team was named on November 8. Tyler Hansbrough of North Carolina was the leading vote-getter (65 of 72 votes). The rest of the team included Joakim Noah of Florida (64 votes), Ronald Steele of Alabama (55), Glen Davis of LSU (51) and Brandon Rush of Kansas (26).
 Wisconsin's Alando Tucker, Boston College's Jared Dudley, Nevada's Nick Fazekas, Albany's Jamar Wilson, Jackson State's Trey Johnson, San Diego State's Brandon Heath, Texas Tech's Jarius Jackson, Hofstra's Loren Stokes, Liberty's Larry Blair, and Towson's Gary Neal (who transferred from La Salle) all eclipsed the career 2000-point mark during the season.
 Oral Roberts had a pair of teammates – Caleb Green and Ken Tutt – both reach the career 2000-point milestone during the season.
 Jackson State's Trey Johnson had the highest single-game scoring output of the season, scoring 49 points in a game against UTEP on December 22, 2006.
 Winston-Salem State and NJIT moved up to Division I competition.
 Conference realignments: Chicago State moved out of the Mid-Continent Conference and became independent. Florida Atlantic moved from the Atlantic Sun Conference to the Sun Belt Conference. Northern Colorado joined the Big Sky Conference after being independent. Central Arkansas and Texas A&M – Corpus Christi joined the Southland Conference. TAMU-CC had been independent while Central Arkansas moved up to division I.
 Kareem Abdul-Jabbar, Austin Carr, Dick Groat, Dick Barnett, Adolph Rupp, Lefty Driesell, Phog Allen, Guy Lewis, John McLendon, Norm Stewart and Vic Bubas were inducted into the College Basketball Hall of Fame.

Rules changes 
Beginning in 2006–2007, the following rules changes were implemented:
 Players can no longer call a time out while they are in the air.

Season outlook

Pre-season polls 
The top 25 from the AP and ESPN/USA Today Coaches Polls, November 6, 2006:

Conference membership changes 

These schools joined new conferences for the 2006–07 season.

Regular season

Conference winners and tournaments 

30 conference seasons conclude with a single-elimination tournament. Traditionally, all conference schools are eligible, regardless of record. However, some conferences, most notably the Big East, do not invite the teams with the worst records. The conference tournament winner receives an automatic bid to the NCAA Tournament. A school that wins the conference regular season title is guaranteed an NIT bid; however, it may receive an at-large bid to the NCAA Tournament.

Major upsets

Regular season and conference tournaments

Key games

Statistical leaders

Conference standings

Post-season tournaments

NCAA tournament 

The NCAA Tournament tipped off on March 13, 2007 with the opening round game in Dayton, Ohio, and concluded on April 2 at the Georgia Dome in Atlanta, Georgia. A total of 65 teams entered the tournament. Thirty of the teams earned automatic bids by winning their conference tournaments. The automatic bid of the Ivy League, which does not conduct a post-season tournament, went to its regular season champion. The remaining 34 teams were granted "at-large" bids, which are extended by the NCAA Selection Committee. The Atlantic Coast Conference led the way with seven bids, while the Big East, Big Ten and Pac-10 each placed six teams in the field. Florida successfully defended their title, beating Ohio State 84–75 in the final and becoming the first team since the 1991–92 Duke Blue Devils to repeat as champions. Florida swingman Corey Brewer was named the tournament's Most Outstanding Player, while guard Lee Humphrey broke the career NCAA Tournament record for three-pointers made.

Final Four – Georgia Dome, Atlanta, Georgia

National Invitation tournament 

After the NCAA Tournament field was announced, the National Invitation Tournament invited 32 teams to participate, reducing the field's size from 40. Eight teams were given automatic bids for winning their conference regular seasons, and 24 other teams were also invited. The field came from 18 conferences, with the Big East and Southeastern Conference tying for the most teams invited with four. For the first time since the NIT began seeding teams, all four No. 1 seeds reached the final four. John Beilein's West Virginia Mountaineers won the title, defeating the Oliver Purnell-coached Clemson Tigers 78–73 in the championship game. The Mountaineers reached the championship game after Darris Nichols' dramatic 3-pointer at the buzzer stunned Mississippi State in the semifinals. Mountaineer guard Frank Young was named tournament MVP.

Semifinals and finals

Award winners

Consensus All-American teams

Major player of the year awards 

 Wooden Award: Kevin Durant, Texas
 Naismith Award: Kevin Durant, Texas
 Associated Press Player of the Year: Kevin Durant, Texas
 NABC Player of the Year: Kevin Durant, Texas
 Oscar Robertson Trophy (USBWA): Kevin Durant, Texas
 Adolph Rupp Trophy: Kevin Durant, Texas
 CBS/Chevrolet Player of the Year: Kevin Durant, Texas
 Sporting News Player of the Year: Kevin Durant, Texas

Major freshman of the year awards 

 USBWA Freshman of the Year: Kevin Durant, Texas
 Sporting News Freshman of the Year: Kevin Durant, Texas

Major coach of the year awards 

 Associated Press Coach of the Year: Tony Bennett, Washington State
 Henry Iba Award (USBWA): Tony Bennett, Washington State
 NABC Coach of the Year: Todd Lickliter, Butler
 Naismith College Coach of the Year: Tony Bennett, Washington State
 CBS/Chevrolet Coach of the Year: Tony Bennett, Washington State
 Adolph Rupp Cup: Bo Ryan, Wisconsin
 Sporting News Coach of the Year: Tony Bennett, Washington State

Other major awards 
 Bob Cousy Award (best point guard): Acie Law IV, Texas A&M
 Pete Newell Big Man Award (best big man): Greg Oden, Ohio State
 NABC Defensive Player of the Year: Greg Oden, Ohio State
 Frances Pomeroy Naismith Award (best player under 6'0"): Tre Kelley, South Carolina
 Lowe's Senior CLASS Award (top senior): Alando Tucker, Wisconsin
 Robert V. Geasey Trophy (top player in Philadelphia Big 5): Ibrahim Jaaber, Penn
 NIT/Haggerty Award (top player in New York City metro area): Jared Jordan, Marist
 Chip Hilton Player of the Year Award (Strong personal character): Acie Law IV, Texas A&M

Coaching changes 
A number of teams changed coaches throughout the season and after the season ended.

References